NGC 861 is a spiral galaxy in the constellation Triangulum. It is estimated to be 360 million light-years from the Milky Way and has a diameter of approximately 165,000 light-years. The object was discovered on September 18, 1865 by Heinrich d'Arrest.

See also 
 List of NGC objects (1–1000)

References 

0861
Spiral galaxies
Triangulum (constellation)
008652